Hellersdorf is a Berlin U-Bahn station located on the  line.

The station opened in July 1989, just a few months before the fall of the Berlin Wall. The eastern extension of (what is now) line U5 was one of the last major construction projects of the former German Democratic Republic.

The station was to be called "Kastanienallee" but was changed to the current name before opening.

References

External links
 U-Bahnhof Hellersdorf page on info-marzahn-hellersdorf.de

U5 (Berlin U-Bahn) stations
Buildings and structures in Marzahn-Hellersdorf
Railway stations in Germany opened in 1989
1989 establishments in East Germany